Shibu Lal (born April 28, 1973) is a Bangladeshi tennis player who has played for Bangladesh Davis Cup team. He lost to American player Daniel McCall 7–6, 6–2 in the first qualifier of the Tiburon Open, United States. Born and raised in Dhaka, he left his country to pursue a professional career in tennis. He now lives in Northern California with his three daughters.

References

Bangladeshi male tennis players
Living people
People from Novato, California
1973 births